Rising from Apadana is the first studio album by Angband, a power metal musical group from Tehran, released on August 29, 2008, through Pure Steel Records.

Track listing

Reception 
The album was well received. Many magazines and webzines were excited to see a signed Power Metal band from Iran where rock/metal musicians have serious obstacles.

Personnel 
 Mahyar Dean - electric guitar, bass guitar
 Ashkan Yazdani - vocals
 Ramin Rahimi - drums
 Produced by Mahyar Dean
 Sound engineered and mixed by Omid Nik Bin, at Rahgozar studio, Tehran
 Mastered by Rocco Stellmacher
 Cover arts by Maziar Dean

External links 

Angband at Facebook
Angband at Last.fm
Pure Steel Records

References 

2008 debut albums
Angband (band) albums